The spiny weapontail (Hoplocercus spinosus) is a lizard belonging to the monotypic genus Hoplocercus. It is found in the Cerrado and adjacent Cerrado–Amazon mosaics in Brazil and Bolivia. It is quite distantly related to the other members of Hoplocercidae, as it is believed to have diverged from these about 35 million years ago.

As suggested by its name, it has a short, highly spiny tail (it is superficially similar to Uromastyx and the smaller species in Ctenosaura); when disturbed, it retreats to its burrow with the tail orientated towards the entrance. It is nocturnal, and feeds on arthropods.

References

Further reading
 Avila-Pires,T.C.S. (1995). Lizards of Brazilian Amazonia (Reptilia: Squamata). Zool. Verh., Leiden 299: 1-706
 Boulenger, G.A. (1885). Catalogue of the lizards in the British Museum (Natural History). Vol. 2, Second edition. London, xiii+497 pp.
 Dirksen, L. & De la Riva, I. 1999. The lizards and amphisbaenians of Bolivia (Reptilia, Squamata): checklist, localities, and bibliography. Graellsia 55: 199-215
 Estes, Richard & Pregill, Gregory, eds. 1988. Phylogenetic relationships of the Lizard Families: Esaays Commemorating Charles L. Camp. Stanford University Press, xvi + 632 pp.
 Fitzinger, L. (1843). Systema Reptilium, fasciculus primus, Amblyglossae. Braumüller et Seidel, Wien: 106 pp.
 Harvey, M. B. (1995). A preliminary list of the reptiles and amphibians of the El Refugio biological reserve. In: Forsyth, A. (ed.), A report on aspects of biodiversity and conservation potential in El Refugio.

Hoplocercidae
Fauna of the Cerrado
Lizards of South America
Reptiles of Bolivia
Reptiles of Brazil
Taxa named by Leopold Fitzinger